Baruta (pop. 317,288) is a municipality within the Metropolitan District of Caracas in Venezuela.

Geography

Baruta is located geographically in the South-East section of the city. Its western limit is the Los Chaguaramos neighborhood (which belongs to the Libertador Bolivarian Municipality) and limits to the east with the Colinas de Los Ruices neighborhood, in the Sucre Municipality. To the North, it borders with the Francisco Fajardo Highway and to the Southeast with the El Hatillo Municipality and to the Southwest with the Hoyo de la Puerta neighborhood (Libertador Municipality).

Economy

The main economic activity in Baruta is non-manufacturing business in the many office buildings within the Municipality. For example, the Procter & Gamble Latin American Headquarters are located there. Commerce is also a great source of revenue for the Baruteños, as some of the most attractive night spots in the Greater Caracas are located in Las Mercedes district. Moreover, "Las Mercedes" hosts a number of small businesses, shopping malls, and restaurants that make the area commercially rich.
The Baruta Zip Code is 1080 and the Area Code is 212, the same as the Greater Caracas area.

Demographics

317,288 inhabitants.   
Density: 2.600 inhabitants/km2.

Parishes
 Nuestra Señora del Rosario de Baruta
 Las Minas de Baruta
 El Cafetal

Government
Although some of the political functions overlap with the Greater Caracas Municipality, Baruta has its own Mayor, Darwin Gonzalez.

The local government has its own police force, among other responsibilities. The City Hall is currently located in the old Baruta town.

Mayors

Culture

In the Municipality diverse cultural manifestations are developed, some associates to popular celebrations, like:  
 Day of the Candlemas (Paradura del niño), Date of celebration: February 2.   
 Carnival, Date of celebration: movable.   
 Holy week, Date of celebration: movable.   
 The cross of May, Date of celebration: May 3.   
 Saint Anthony, Date of celebration: June 13. 
 Saint John, Date of celebration: June 24.   
 Day of Our Lady of the Rosary of Baruta (Month of Baruta), Date of celebration: October 29.   
 Day of Our Lady of Fatima (Las Minas and Monterrey), Date of celebration: October 30.

Urbanización Las Mercedes
Trasnocho Cultural: founded in 2001 in the Paseo Las Mercedes Shopping Center, it houses theaters, cinema, bookstore and the TAC art gallery, as well as a variety of shops.
Teatro Escena 8.
Plaza Alfredo Sadel: named in homage to the Venezuelan tenor of the same name. Since its remodeling in 2007, this space has become a venue for concerts, exhibitions, book fairs and cultural, political and sporting events.

Bello Monte
La Caja de Fósforos: experimental theater room founded in 2014, as part of the stage space management project of the Contrajuego Theater Group, directed by Orlando Arocha. The room is part of the Concha Acústica de Bello Monte Cultural Complex, or José Ángel Lamas Acoustic Shell.

References

External links

 Official Baruta Municipality website

 
Geography of Caracas
Municipalities of Miranda (state)